Susan Winder Tanner (born January 10, 1953) was the twelfth General President of the Young Women organization of the Church of Jesus Christ of Latter-day Saints (LDS Church) from 2002 to 2008.

Born in Granger, Utah, to Richard W. Winder and Barbara Woodhead, Tanner grew up on the Winder family homestead at Winder Dairy. She earned a degree in humanities from Brigham Young University. Tanner married John S. Tanner in the Salt Lake Temple in 1974. They are the parents of five children. She is a great-great granddaughter of church leader John R. Winder.

LDS Church service 
Tanner was called by LDS Church president Gordon B. Hinckley as the Young Women General President on October 5, 2002, succeeding Margaret D. Nadauld. As president of the Young Women, Tanner was an ex officio member of the church's Boards of Trustees/Education. From 2002 to 2007, Tanner's counselors in the Young Women general presidency were Julie B. Beck and Elaine S. Dalton. In 2007, Beck was called as the general president of the Relief Society; as a result, from 2007 to 2008, Dalton served as Tanner's first counselor, with Mary N. Cook as her second counselor. In 2008, Tanner was succeeded as president of the Young Women by Dalton.

After she was released as Young Women president and at the request of the church, Tanner wrote  Daughters in My Kingdom (2011), a book about the history of the Relief Society published by the LDS Church and distributed to adult women members.

From 2011 to 2014, Tanner served with her husband, while he was president of the church's Brazil Sao Paulo South Mission. The Tanners lived to Laie, Hawaii, from 2015 to 2020 while her husband served as the 10th president of Brigham Young University-Hawaii.

References

External links 
 "Susan Winder Tanner Young Women General President", Liahona, November 2002.
 "Timeline of Young Women General Presidents", churchofjesuschrist.org.

Living people
1953 births
American leaders of the Church of Jesus Christ of Latter-day Saints
Brigham Young University alumni
General Presidents of the Young Women (organization)
People from Provo, Utah
People from West Valley City, Utah
Female Mormon missionaries
21st-century Mormon missionaries
American Mormon missionaries in Brazil
Mission presidents (LDS Church)
Tanner family
Latter Day Saints from Utah